Out of Bounds is a 1989 American autobiography of actor and former professional football player Jim Brown.  The book was co-written by Brown with Steve Delsohn.

References

1989 non-fiction books
English-language books
Sports autobiographies
American memoirs